Muldoanich is an uninhabited island in the Barra Isles archipelago at the southern extremity of the larger island chain of the Outer Hebrides in Scotland.

It has no level ground. There are no census records, but the southern headland of Vanish (meaning "headland of the house" or "sacred place" in Gaelic) may indicate habitation at some time in the past.

Etymology
The name "Muldoanich" is probably the anglicised version of the  meaning "Duncan's rounded hill". It is shown with that name on Ordnance Survey maps. Mul Domhnach, meaning "Sunday island", is another possible derivation. Writing in the 16th century, Dean Munro referred to the island as "Scarp" and it appears as "Scarpa" on Blaeu's atlas of 1654. 

Martin Martin refers to "Muldonish" in his 1695 voyage around the Western Isles, stating "about a mile in circumference; it is high in the middle, covered over with heath and grass, and is the only forest here for maintaining the deer, being commonly about seventy or eighty in number."

References

Barra Isles
Uninhabited islands of the Outer Hebrides